CSKA Moscow is a major Russian sports club based in Moscow. It was created in 1911 in the Russian Empire on base of OLLS (Skiing Society, founded 1901). Later, during the Soviet era, it was the central part of the Armed Forces sports society, which in turn was associated with the Soviet Army; because of this, it was popularly referred to in the West as "Red Army" or "the Red Army team". The historical CSKA sport club (a.k.a. "Big CSKA") is still a department of the Russian Defense Ministry.

Composition
The "Big CSKA" had several teams in many sports, but those which are still operating are all now private clubs:

The CSKA has also been home to many elite figure skaters, including Adelina Sotnikova, Ekaterina Gordeeva and Sergei Grinkov.  Elena Mukhina, the 1978 World Champion artistic gymnast, Aliya Mustafina and Yevgeniya Kanayeva, Olympic gold medalists in gymnastics, Sofya Velikaya, a sabre fencer, Olympic champions Elena Vesnina, Viktor An and many others are also members of the sports club.

Brief overview
The club was created as the "Experimentally demonstrative Military Sports field of Vsevobuch" (OPPV) in February 1923 by the Central Administration of Military Training for workers based on the pre-revolutionary "Society of Ski Sports Amateurs" (OLLS). The field was located at the Sokolniki Park in Moscow. On April 29, 1923, the football team of the club has played its first game in the Moscow city championship. In February 1928 the club was included to the newly established the Frunze Central House of Red Army (CDKA) as a department of physical culture and sports. In October 1953 all sports centers of CDKA and Air Force of the Moscow Military District were included in the Central Sports Club of Ministry of Defense (CSK MO), which in April 1960 it was renamed into its more common title - the Central Sports Club of the Armed Forces (CSKA), which the Moscow branch belonged as the flagship and most elite of all the clubs within the Soviet Armed Forces.

The club is active in more than 40 sports, and produced 463 Olympic champions for the Soviet Union and Russia, 11,000 champions in local Soviet and Russian championships, and 2629 golden medalists in European and world championships.

In 1973 the CSKA sports society was awarded the Order of Lenin.

Chiefs and presidents

References 

 
Military sports clubs
Multi-sport clubs in Russia
Sports clubs in Moscow
Sports clubs established in 1923
1923 establishments in Russia